JJ Kavanagh and Sons is Ireland's largest private coach operator. It was founded in 1919 by J.J. Kavanagh with the operation of a service connecting Urlingford with Kilkenny City.

The company has expanded greatly since the 1990s with the take-over of Kenneally's coach operators in Waterford. Its head office is in Urlingford, County Kilkenny. There are also offices in Naas, Dublin, Clonmel, Nenagh, Waterford and Carlow. JJ Kavanagh and Sons is a member of the CTTC.

History

Beginnings (1919-1980)
JJ Kavanagh and Sons was founded in 1919 by JJ Kavanagh with the running of a daily coach service between Urlingford and Kilkenny. Over the following years, the company gradually expanded with in an increase in fleet size and number of routes with the introduction of an Urlingford - Clonmel route. At the time, the company had a lucrative delivery contract with some of Ireland's largest newspaper companies.

Change in Market and Rapid Expansion (1980-2010)
With the decline in the prominence of the newspaper in Ireland JJ Kavanagh and Sons lost their lucrative delivery deal and were forced to find new sources of finance. Under management of current managers, JJ and Paul the business has seen rapid expansion over the past three decades as they have launched many intercity routes as well as becoming prominent transporters in the private travel area in Ireland. The expansion of intercity routes has been made possible for the company as a result of their acquisition of a number of coach companies across the south-east of Ireland in Naas, Nenagh, Waterford and Clonmel as well as the opening of sub-offices in Carlow and Dublin.

International Expansion and Beyond (2011- )
To further boost profits the company sought international expansion. Expansion occurred with the purchase of Mullany's coaches in Watford, England. The deal is believed to have been in the region of €1million.

Services Operated
The company also currently operates a number of local bus services, including those in Waterford and Tramore and intercity express services From Dublin Airport and Dublin city to Limerick, Waterford, Clonmel, Carlow and Kilkenny.
It has also started a new service (2019) Dublin Airport and Dublin City hourly to Nass Co.Kildare

Fleet
The company's coach fleet, which operates on intercity services, is made up of over 100 modern Setra 400 series Neoplan Tourliner and as of late Mercedes Tourismo coaches which feature air conditioning, reclining seats, on-board toilets, seatbelts, USB sockets and audio/visual facilities. The number plate of each bus is made up entirely of number ones.

It was the first coach company in Ireland to introduce free Wi-Fi onto some of its coaches in 2009.

The bus fleet operated by the company on the town and city routes is made up of Mercedes-Benz Citaros.

J. J. Kavanagh & Sons became the first operator of the MCV Evora in Ireland, taking delivery of three examples in early 2018.

Other works
JJ Kavanagh and Sons plays a very active role in the Kilkenny and Carlow G.A.A. scene, sponsoring numerous of the hurling and gaelic football competitions in the counties. They currently sponsor the Kilkenny camogie team.

References

External links 
JJ Kavanagh & Sons

Bus transport in the Republic of Ireland
Bus companies of the Republic of Ireland
Transport in County Kilkenny
Transport in County Tipperary